Highway 95 is a north-south highway in the southeastern corner of British Columbia, opened in 1957.  The highway connects with U.S. Route 95, from which the highway takes its number, at the Canada–U.S. border at Kingsgate, just north of Eastport, Idaho.  The section between the Canada-U.S. border and the Crowsnest Highway is known as the Yahk–Kingsgate Highway while the section between the Crowsnest Highway and Golden is known as the Kootenay–Columbia Highway.

Highway 95 is one of the most overlapped highways in the province, i.e., it shares most of its route with other numbered highways.

Route description

It connects to U.S. Route 95 at the Eastport-Kingsgate Border Crossing.

From the Fort Steele junction, Highway 95 follows Highway 93 north for  through the community of Wasa, to where Highway 95A's east junction is located. North of Canal Flats, Highway 93/95 travels for  along the Columbia River, through the communities of Fairmont Hot Springs, Windermere  and Invermere to the town of Radium Hot Springs, where Highway 93 diverges east.

History
Prior to 1941, British Columbia used lettered routes as opposed to numbers, and the Kootenay–Columbia Highway between Cranbrook and Golden was designated as part of Route U, which continued south to U.S. Route 93 at Roosville along present-day Highway 93. In 1941, British Columbia introduced numbered highways, with Highway 95 begin designated on  Yahk–Kingsgate Highway, the northern extension of U.S. Route 95, while the Kootenay–Columbia Highway between Cranbrook and Golden was designated as Highway 4. In 1953, the Highway 4 was moved to its present location on Vancouver Island, with the Kootenay–Columbia Highway being renumbered to Highway 95. In 1968, Highway 95 was realigned to bypass Kimberley, with the former section becoming Highway 95A.

Major intersections
From south to north:

See also
 List of British Columbia provincial highways

References

External links

095